Chalking the door is a Christian Epiphanytide tradition used to bless one's home.

Epiphany 
Either on Twelfth Night (5 January), the twelfth day of Christmastide and eve of the feast of the Epiphany, or on Epiphany Day (6 January) itself, many Christians (including Anglicans, Lutherans, Methodists, Presbyterians and Roman Catholics, among others) write on their doors or lintels with chalk in a pattern such as "20 ✝ C ✝ M ✝ B ✝ ". The numbers in this example refer to the calendar year  and the crosses to Christ. The letters C, M, and B stand for the traditional names of the Magi (Caspar, Melchior and Balthazar), or alternatively for the Latin blessing  ('May Christ bless this house'). 

Chalking the door is done most commonly on Epiphany Day itself. However, it can be done on any day of the Epiphany season. In some localities, the chalk used to write the Epiphanytide pattern is blessed by a Christian priest or minister on Epiphany Day, then taken home to write the pattern. 

The Christian custom of chalking the door has a biblical precedent as the Israelites in the Old Testament marked their doors in order to be saved from death; likewise, the Epiphanytide practice serves to protect Christian homes from evil spirits until the next Epiphany Day, at which time the custom is repeated. Families also perform this act to represent the hospitality of the Holy Family to the Magi (and all Gentiles); it thus serves as a house blessing to invite the presence of God in one's home.

In 20th century Poland, the practice of chalking the door continued among believers as a way of asserting their Christian identity, despite the Eastern Bloc's state atheism and antireligious campaigns.

Gallery: Epiphany season door chalking

Footnotes

References

External links 
Epiphany Door Chalking by Christ the King Anglican Church
An Epiphany Blessing of Homes and Chalking the Door by Discipleship Ministries of The United Methodist Church 
Chalking the Door: An Epiphany House Blessing 2016  by the Roman Catholic Order of Carmelites

Christmastide
Epiphany (holiday)
Chalk
Religious rituals